Mora is a South American drink consisting of blackberry juice, water and sugar. It is dark red in color and tart to sweet in flavor.

See also
 List of juices
 Mora (plant)

References

Fruit juice